Ananda TV, also known by its acronym ATV, is a Bangladeshi Bengali-language privately owned satellite and cable television channel headquartered in the Chairman Bari neighborhood of Banani in Dhaka, which commenced official transmissions on 11 March 2018 with the "Hridoyer Kotha Bole" (হৃদয়ের কথা বলে) slogan. The channel's programming consists of both news and entertainment.

History 
Ananda TV was initially licensed as 'ATV' by the Bangladesh Telecommunication Regulatory Commission in November 2013. Its frequency allocation was granted in January 2015. Ananda TV commenced test transmissions on 24 January 2018. Later, they were allowed to officially commence transmissions on 14 February 2018.

A press conference regarding the launch of the channel was held in its headquarters on 10 March. Later, Ananda TV officially began broadcasting the following day, with a launch ceremony held. It also claimed to aim to showcase the Bengali culture and heritage to audiences by the spirit of the liberation war.

The channel's founder was Abbas Ullah Shikder, the producer of the popular 1989 Bangladeshi film, Beder Meye Josna, who later died on 18 January 2020. Others present at the launch ceremony were the Minister of Information Hasanul Haq Inu, Ananda TV's former chairman Hasan Taufique Abbas, and former managing director Nurul Islam. The channel began broadcasting via the Bangabandhu-1 satellite in 2019. On 21 August 2021, the building where Ananda TV is based in caught on fire.

References

External links
 
 Ananda TV on Facebook
 Ananda TV on YouTube

Television channels in Bangladesh
Television channels and stations established in 2018
Mass media in Dhaka
2018 establishments in Bangladesh